Leucozona americana  Curran 1923, the American whitebelt fly, is an uncommon species of syrphid fly observed throughout northern North America. Hoverflies can remain nearly motionless in flight. The  adults are also known as flower flies for they are commonly found on flowers, from which they get both energy-giving nectar and protein rich pollen. Larvae are not known.

References

Diptera of North America
Syrphinae
Syrphini
Hoverflies of North America
Insects described in 1923